This list of museums in New Hampshire is a list of museums, defined for this context as institutions (including nonprofit organizations, government entities, and private businesses) that collect and care for objects of cultural, artistic, scientific, or historical interest and make their collections or related exhibits available for public viewing. Museums that exist only in cyberspace (i.e., virtual museums) are not included. Also included are non-profit art galleries.

Defunct museums
 Children’s Metamorphosis, Derry
 Christie's Maple Farm and Maple Museum, Lancaster

See also

 List of nature centers in New Hampshire

References

External links
 New Hampshire Living: New Hampshire Museums by Region
 Visit New Hampshire

Museums
New Hampshire
Museums